Homaloxestis hilaris is a moth in the family Lecithoceridae. It is found in Taiwan and Zhejiang, China.

The wingspan is 15 mm.

References

Moths described in 1978
Homaloxestis